RCA is an American multinational trademark brand owned by Talisman Brands, Inc. which is used on products made by that company as well as Sony Music Entertainment, Voxx International and ON Corporation.  'RCA' is an abbreviation for the Radio Corporation of America, founded in 1919. The company became known as the RCA Corporation in 1969. RCA was purchased by General Electric in 1986 and its various divisions and assets were then liquidated.

Current users
At present, the RCA trademark is owned by Talisman Brand, Inc. d/b/a Established. since 2022, Though it generally no longer uses the brand directly, Talisman Brand, Inc. d/b/a Established. licenses the RCA trademark to other companies for use on various products along 10 different product lines:

 RCA Records (RCA Victor): now licensed to Sony Music Entertainment, which acquired the  record label  through their former joint venture Sony BMG (2004–08). In 1987, BMG purchased RCA Records and several subsidiary and associated record labels directly from GE following the acquisition of the RCA Corporation, together with a perpetual license to use the various RCA brands and trademarks (including RCA's interest in the famous Nipper His Master's Voice trademark).  As a perpetual license, it has survived both GE's sale of the brand name to Thomson and BMG's transfer of RCA Records and associated labels to Sony BMG and Sony Music.
 RCA Telephones: Formerly manufactured by Thomson SA, sold in 2009 to Telefield North America
 RCA Audio/Video: Manufactured by Voxx, produces RCA DVD players, video cassette recorders, direct broadcast satellite decoders, camcorders, and audio equipment. (link on Voxx website)
 RCA Accessories: Manufactured by Voxx, produces Audio and video connectors, remote controls, keyboards, Computer mice and television antennas.
 RCA Televisions: Manufactured by Curtis International Ltd. (Canada) (Was ON Corporation)
 RCA Car Stereo: Also known as RCA Mobile
 RCA Appliances: Produces RCA brand Microwaves, refrigerators, and ranges marketed by Curtis International Ltd. (Canada)
 RCA Computers: Produces RCA Computers marketed by American Future Technology Corporation
 RCA Computer Tablets: RCA tablets manufactured by  Alco Electronics Ltd.
 RCA Projectors: Manufactured by Telefield
 RCA Digital TV Box: Produces RCA Set-top Boxes marketed by Search Commercial Inc. (Philippines).
 RCA Communication Systems: Two-way radios
 
BMG (for the record labels) and Thomson (for the remaining businesses) bought those assets from General Electric, which took over the RCA Corporation in 1986 and kept RCA's NBC broadcast television interests (GE sold off the NBC Radio Network and the NBC-owned radio stations). Initially, GE continued to own the RCA trademarks (including the His Master's Voice/Nipper and Victor/Victrola trademarks which were then licensed to Thomson and Bertelsmann Music Group. Thomson eventually purchased the rights to the RCA trademarks from GE in 2003 subject to the perpetual license GE had issued to BMG.

In December 2006, Thomson SA agreed to sell its consumer electronics accessory business, including rights to use the RCA name for consumer electronic accessories, to Audiovox

On October 16, 2007, Thomson SA agreed to sell its consumer electronics audio video business outside Europe including the worldwide rights to the RCA Brand for consumer electronics audio video products

In April 2010, ON Corporation took over distribution of RCA branded TVs.

Bertelsmann AG was new to the RCA family (though the creation of Sony BMG is similar to that of EMI more than 70 years earlier). Sony took full ownership of Sony BMG in 2008 and the record company was renamed Sony Music.  Thomson started as the French subsidiary of Thomson-Houston Electric, a company which later evolved into General Electric.

In 2022, Technicolor sold the trademark and licensing rights to the RCA brand and logos to Talisman Brands, Inc.

Sponsorship

RCA sponsored the Argentinian football club San Lorenzo de Almagro from 2005 until 2007, and the Argentinian football club Estudiantes de La Plata from 2008 to mid-2011. It currently sponsors Racing, another first division Argentinean football club.

In the mid-1990s, RCA bought the naming rights to the Hoosier Dome (the original home of the Indianapolis Colts). The stadium became the RCA Dome and was known as such until it was demolished in December 2008 when the Colts departed for the new Lucas Oil Stadium and the Indiana Convention Center was expanded onto the RCA Dome footprint.

RCA was the main sponsor for the #98 Cale Yarborough Racing NASCAR team between 1995 and 1997.

References

External links
 RCA website

RCA
2022 mergers and acquisitions